Simona Abbate (born 22 August 1983) was an Italian female water polo player. She was part of the Italy women's national water polo team.

She participated at the 2012 Summer Olympics.
She also competed at the 2011 World Aquatics Championships.

References

External links

1983 births
Living people
Italian female water polo players
Water polo players at the 2012 Summer Olympics
Olympic water polo players of Italy
21st-century Italian women